The dusky spinetail (Synallaxis moesta) is a species of bird in the family Furnariidae. It is found in Colombia, Ecuador, and Peru. Its natural habitats are subtropical or tropical moist lowland forests and heavily degraded former forest.

References

Synallaxis
Birds described in 1856
Birds of Colombia
Birds of Ecuador
Birds of Peru
Taxonomy articles created by Polbot